Michael Kerin Morgan AO is an Australian neurosurgeon. He is a cerebrovascular surgeon at Macquarie University Hospital, Sydney.

Morgan was born in Royal Tunbridge Wells in Kent, England, and emigrated with his family to Australia in 1957. He completed his medical degree at the University of Sydney in 1980 and his M.D. in 1991. Following completion of his neurosurgical training in 1986 at Sydney's Royal Prince Alfred Hospital and the Royal Alexandra Hospital for Children, Morgan undertook a Fellowship in Neurosurgery at the Mayo Clinic in Rochester, Minnesota, under the mentorship of Thoralf M. Sundt. Morgan was appointed Professor of Neurosurgery at The University of Sydney in 1998 and Chair of Neurosurgery at Royal North Shore Hospital until 2006. In 2006 he became the inaugural Dean of Medicine at Macquarie University.

Honours 
Michael Morgan was inducted into the American Academy of Neurological Surgery in 1999.
In 2014 Morgan was awarded an officer in the general division (AO) of the Order of Australia "For distinguished service to medicine as a neurovascular surgeon, researcher and educator, as an international leader and mentor, and to professional organisations."

Notable publications 
Morgan's most cited publications (> 100 citations each) are:

References

1956 births
Living people
Australian neurosurgeons
University of Sydney alumni
Academic staff of the University of Sydney
Academic staff of Macquarie University
English emigrants to Australia
People from Royal Tunbridge Wells
Medical doctors from Sydney